Pikku-Vesijärvi is a pond in Lahti, Päijänne Tavastia, Finland. Its greatest depth is 4.5 meters (1998). Around the pond is an arboretum where is even more than 40 tree species. Also, near Pikku-Vesijärvi is Lanu-puisto, a park where is 12 Olavi Lanu's statues made of concrete. The pond has connection to Vesijärvi. Pikku-Vesijärvi is a popular social spot and is located near to Lahti's center.

References

Kartano
Landforms of Päijät-Häme
Lakes of Lahti
Tourist attractions in Päijät-Häme